Minori is a unisex Japanese given name. Notable people with the name include:

, Japanese voice actress and singer
, Japanese artistic gymnast
, Japanese runner
, Japanese manga artist
, Japanese voice actress
, Japanese javelin thrower
, Japanese softball player
, Japanese actor
, Japanese shogi player 
, Japanese male footballer
, Japanese voice actress and singer

Fictional characters 
 , a character from the video game series Arcana Heart
 , a character from the video game Hatsune Miku: Colorful Stage!!
 , a character from the light novel series Toradora!
 , a character from the anime series Tropical-Rouge! Pretty Cure

See also 

 Minoru
 Minori (disambiguation)

Japanese unisex given names